The 1937 College Football All-America team is composed of college football players who were selected as All-Americans by various organizations and writers that chose College Football All-America Teams in 1937. The ten selectors recognized by the NCAA as "official" for the 1937 season are (1) Collier's Weekly, as selected by Grantland Rice, (2) the Associated Press (AP), (3) the United Press (UP), (4) the All-America Board (AAB), (5) the International News Service (INS), (6) Liberty magazine, (7) the Newspaper Enterprise Association (NEA), (8) Newsweek, (9) the North American Newspaper Alliance (NANA), and (10) the Sporting News (SN).

Consensus All-Americans
For the year 1937, the NCAA recognizes 10 published All-American teams as "official" designations for purposes of its consensus determinations. The following chart identifies the NCAA-recognized consensus All-Americans and displays which first-team designations they received.

All-American selections for 1937

Ends
 Chuck Sweeney, Notre Dame (AP-1; UP-1; INS-3; CP-1; NW; NEA-3)
 Andy Bershak, North Carolina (AP-3; UP-2; COL-1; INS-3; NEA-1; CP-1; CE-1; SN; NANA)
 John Wysocki, Villanova (UP-1; INS-1; NEA-1; CP-3; LIB)
 Raymond King, Minnesota ( UP-3; INS-1; CP-2; CE-1; WC-1; AAB; NW; NEA-2 [t])
 Jerome H. Holland, Cornell (College Football Hall of Fame) (AP-1; COL-1)
 Bill Daddio, Pittsburgh (UP-3; SN)
 Perry Schwartz, California (WC-1; AAB)
 Frank Souchak, Pittsburgh (UP-2; INS-2; LIB; NEA-2)
 Bill Jordan, Georgia Tech (AP-2; INS-2; NEA-3)
 Jim Benton, Arkansas (AP-3; CP-3; NANA)
 Elmer Dohmann, Nebraska (CP-2)
 Pete Smith, Oklahoma (AP-2)

Tackles
 Ed Franco, Fordham (College Football Hall of Fame) (AP-1; UP-1; COL-1; CP-1; SN; NW; NEA-2)
 Tony Matisi, Pittsburgh  (AP-1; UP-2; INS-2; CE-1; WC-1; AAB; NANA; NEA-2 [e])
 Bruiser Kinard, Ole Miss (College and Pro Football Hall of Fame) (AP-3; UP-1; INS-1; NEA-1; CE-1; SN)
 Ed Beinor, Notre Dame (UP-3; NEA-1; CP-3; WC-1; AAB)
 Vic Markov, Washington (College Football Hall of Fame) (AP-2; COL-1; INS-1; LIB)
 Jim Ryba, Alabama (INS-3; CP-1)
 I. B. Hale, TCU (LIB)
 Al Babartsky, Fordham (INS-3; NANA)
 Fred Shirey, Nebraska (UP-2; INS-2; NW; NEA-3 [e])
 John Mellus, Villanova (AP-2)
 Alexander Kevorkian, Harvard (CP-2)
 Eddie Gatto, LSU (AP-3)
 Jim Tipton, Alabama (UP-3)
 Ted Doyle, Nebraska (CP-3)
Alvord Wolff, Santa Clara (NEA-3)

Guards
 Joe Routt, Texas A&M (College Football Hall of Fame) (AP-1; UP-1; COL-1; INS-2; NEA-1; CP-1; CE-1; SN; LIB; NANA; NW)
 Leroy Monsky, Alabama (AP-1; UP-2; COL-1; INS-2; CP-2; WC-1; SN; AAB; LIB; NEA-2)
 Vard Stockton, California  (UP-1; INS-1; NEA-1; CP-1; NANA)
 Gust Zarnas, Ohio State (WC-1; AAB; NW)
 Phil Dougherty, Santa Clara (INS-1)
 Hedwig, California (CE-1)
 Frank Twedell, Minnesota (AP-2; UP-2; INS-3; CP-3; NEA-3)
 Gregory Zitrides, Dartmouth (AP-3; INS-3)
 Ralph Sivell, Auburn (AP-3; CP-2)
 Albin Lezouski Pittsburgh (AP-2)
 Norman Buckner, Tulane (UP-3)
 Steve Slivinski, Washington (NEA-2; UP-3)
 Joe Nee, Harvard (CP-3)
 Joe Ruetz, Notre Dame (NEA-3)

Centers
 Alex Wojciechowicz, Fordham (College and Pro Football Hall of Fame) (AP-3; UP-1; INS-1; CP-2; CE-1; WC-1; SN; AAB; NANA; NEA-3)
 Carl Hinkle, Vanderbilt (College Football Hall of Fame) (AP-1; UP-2; COL-1; INS-2; CP-1; LIB)
 Charley Brock, Nebraska (NEA-1)
 Bob Herwig, California (College Football Hall of Fame) (NEA-2; UP-3; INS-3; NW)
 Ki Aldrich, TCU (College Football Hall of Fame) (First pick in the 1939 NFL Draft) (AP-2)
 Phil Doherty, Santa Clara (CP-3)

Quarterbacks
 Clint Frank, Yale (College Football Hall of Fame) ( AP-1; UP-1; COL-1; INS-1; NEA-1 [hb]; CP-1; CE-1; WC-1; SN; AAB; LIB; NANA; NW)
 Sid Luckman, Columbia (College and Pro Football Hall of Fame) (Second pick in the 1939 NFL Draft) (AP-3; UP-2; NEA-3 [hb])
 Andy Puplis, Notre Dame (UP-3; CP-3)
 Nile Kinnick, Iowa (NEA-3)
 Elmore Hackney, Duke (INS-2; NEA-2 [qb])

Halfbacks
 Marshall Goldberg, Pittsburgh (College Football Hall of Fame) (AP-1; UP-1 [fb] ; COL-1; INS-1 [hb]; NEA-1; CP-1; CE-1; WC-1; SN; AAB; NANA; NW)
 Byron White, Colorado (College Football Hall of Fame) (AP-1; UP-1; COL-1; INS-1; NEA-1 [qb]; CP-1; CE-1; SN; LIB)
 Corbett Davis, Indiana (First pick in the 1938 NFL Draft) (INS-2 [fb]; CP-1; WC-1; AAB [fb]; LIB; NANA; NW; NEA-2 [fb])
 Davey O'Brien, TCU (College Football Hall of Fame) (AP-2; UP-3; CP-2 [qb])
 John Pingel, Michigan State (College Football Hall of Fame) ((AP-2; INS-3; CP-3)
 Bill Osmanski, Holy Cross (College Football Hall of Fame) (AP-2; INS-2; NEA-3 [fb])
 Bob MacLeod, Dartmouth (College Football Hall of Fame) ((AP-3; CP-2)
 Hugh Wolfe, Texas (UP-2)
 Joseph Gray, Oregon State (AP-2)
 Jim McDonald, Ohio State (Second pick in the 1938 NFL Draft) (AP-3)
 Vic Bottari, California (College Football Hall of Fame) (UP-3; NEA-2)
 Andy Stopper, Villanova (INS-3)
 William "Bullet Bill" Patterson, Baylor (CP-3)

Fullbacks
 Sam Chapman, California (College Football Hall of Fame) (AP-1; UP-1; COL-1; INS-2; CP-2 [fb]; WC-1; AAB [hb]; LIB; NANA; NEA-3 [hb])
 Joe Kilgrow, Alabama (UP-2 [hb]; INS-1; CP-2 [hb]; SN; NW; NEA-2 [hb])
 George Karamatic, Gonzaga (UP-2; NEA-1)
 Johnny "Jelly Belly" Meek, California (INS-3 [qb]; CE-1)
 Cecil Isbell, Purdue (College Football Hall of Fame) (AP-3; UP-3; CP-3)
 George "Pinky" Rohm, LSU (INS-3)

Key
Bold = Consensus All-American
 -1 – First-team selection
 -2 – Second-team selection
 -3 – Third-team selection

Official selectors
 AAB = All-America Board
 AP = Associated Press
 COL = Collier's Weekly
 INS = International News Service
 LIB = Liberty magazine
 NANA = North American Newspaper Alliance
 NEA = Newspaper Enterprise Association
 NW = Newsweek
 SN = The Sporting News
 UP = United Press, "selected by United Press sports writers, aided by 12 of the nation's foremost coaches"

Other selectors
 CP = Central Press Association: "Chosen by more than 30 captains of leading universities and college teams in every part of the country, the eighth annual Captain's All-American is presented herewith."
 CE = Collyer's Eye, selected by "sixty-seven nationally prominent football coaches, representing every major institution of learning, conference and district in the United States"
 WC = Walter Camp Football Foundation

See also
 1937 All-Big Six Conference football team
 1937 All-Big Ten Conference football team
 1937 All-Pacific Coast Conference football team
 1937 All-SEC football team

References

All-America Team
College Football All-America Teams